Apna Asmaan (transl. Our sky) is a 2007 Bollywood drama film directed by Kaushik Roy, and stars Irrfan Khan, Shobana and Dhruv Piyush Panjuani in pivotal roles, with Rajat Kapoor and Anupam Kher in important supporting roles. Khan plays the protagonist, an "everyman" who is discontented with a failing marriage and an autistic son Buddhi played by Dhruv Panjuani. He is constantly blamed by his wife Padmini, played by Shobana, for their son's condition. After meeting a scientist Dr. Sathya, played by Anupam Kher, Ravi obtains a drug which cures mental disorders from him and injects Buddhi, leading him to become intelligent. However, in the process, Buddhi starts to forget his parents and friends, leading to uncontrollable tragic events.

The film was originally planned in 1999 by director Kaushik Roy, who conceptualised the idea from his own child Orko. According to the former, the film deals with autism, an issue which is foreseen as a taboo in Indian society. The film made its theatrical debut in India on 7 September 2007, with international premieres held at ReelWorld Film Festival in Toronto, San Luis Cine Festival and Stuttgart Film Festival in 2008. The film received several accolades in various film festivals, notably one German Star of India award and one Gala Dinner & INAP Award.

Apna Asmaan received mixed reviews from critics, who debated the direction and story, but praised the acting, themes and messages about the parents' over-ambitious dreams inherited to their children. It was cited as one of the most-talked films of 2007, which established the film as art film rather than a commercial film.

Story
Ravi Kumar is a plastic salesman working for Opel Plastics who is enduring a failing marriage. He has a son Buddhi, who is autistic and a slow learner. Because of Buddhi, Ravi and his wife Padmini shares a resented relationship, where she blames Ravi for Buddhi's intellectual handicap. One day, Ravi watches an interview of a scientist Dr. Sathya, who invented a controversial drug called "brain booster" which can cure mental problems. He comes with a notion to meet Sathya and get the medicine from him. After meeting with Sathya; he gets the medicine and reluctantly injects in Buddhi, which grants him intellectual strength. However, the drug has a side-effect, amnesia in which he starts to forget his parents and relatives.

Thereafter, Buddhi changes his lifestyle and turns out to be extremely popular among his classmates. Despite Buddhi's arrogant and unruly behaviour, his parents are happy to see that he is normal. But, on the other hand, Ravi learns that Sathya has connections in underworld drug cartel, and he is now wanted by police. After winning a mathematics quiz show, Buddhi is given the title of "Aryabhatta"; and becomes popular in media and receives fame as a "mathe-magician" celebrity. After "Aryabhatta" indulges in several kinds of vices, his parents learns that Buddhi's limbic brain has been damaged, where their family doctor Dr. Sen concludes that limbic brain dysfunction leads to negative and anti social personality. In order to stop "Aryabhatta", Ravi and Padmini seeks help of Dr. Sen to find out Dr. Sathya for antidote. Dr. Sen, Ravi and Padmini tracks down Sathya, who was hiding in an old-age home. Ravi and Padmini retrieve the antidote from him, and Sathya apologises the couple for destroying Buddhi's life.

One night, In an attempt to inject the antidote in "Aryabhatta", he starts to threat and attacks Ravi with the same injection. In order to save Ravi from "Aryabhatta", Padmini attacks him and injects him with the medicine, thus calming the latter. The next day, Buddhi returns to his normal self and begins to paint again. His paintings are now exhibited by his parents; thus accepting his talent.

Cast
Irrfan Khan as Ravi Kumar
Shobana as Padmini Kumar
Anupam Kher as Dr. Sathya
Rajat Kapoor as Dr. Sen
Dhruv Piyush Panjuani as Buddhi Kumar and Aryabhatta
Utkarsha Naik as Mrs. Sharma
Nassar Abdulla as Mr. Sharma
Barkha Singh as Pinky Sharma

Production

Development
Director Kaushik Roy conceptualised the idea in 1999 from his own son Orko. He stated that the film has message for parents who has over-ambitious dreams.

Music

The music of the film is composed by Lesle Lewis and lyrics written by Mehboob.

References

External links

2000s Hindi-language films
2007 films
Films scored by Lesle Lewis
2007 drama films
Indian drama films
Films about dissociative identity disorder
Films shot in Mumbai
Films about drugs
Films about autism
Hindi-language drama films